Norman Joseph Greeney (1910-1985) was a professional American football player who played offensive lineman for one seasons for the Green Bay Packers and Pittsburgh Steelers.

Norm was a graduate of John Marshall High School in Cleveland, OH 

Norm went to college at Notre Dame and played guard between 1929–1933.  In 1933 he was signed by the Green Bay Packers.  In 1934 and 1935 he played for the Pittsburgh Pirates (now known as the Pittsburgh Steelers).

Norm married Laverne Gertrude Eiben in 1933 and had three children, Patricia, Sharron, and Kevin.

References

1910 births
American football offensive linemen
Green Bay Packers players
Pittsburgh Steelers players
Notre Dame Fighting Irish football players
1985 deaths
Players of American football from Cleveland